Winogradskyella is a genus of bacteria from the family of Flavobacteriaceae. Winogradskyella is named after the Russian microbiologist Sergei Winogradsky.

Species
The genus Winogradskyella comprises the following species:

W. algae
W. algicola
W. aquimaris
W. arenosi
Ca. W. atlantica
W. aurantia
W. aurantiaca
W. costae
W. crassostreae
W. damuponensis
W. echinorum
W. eckloniae
W. endarachnes
W. epiphytica
W. exilis 
W. eximia
W. flava
W. forsetii	
W. haliclonae
W. helgolandensis	
W. jejuensis
W. litorisediminis
W. litoriviva
W. ludwigii
W. lutea
W. maritima
W. multivorans
W. pacifica
W. pocilloporae
W. poriferorum
W. profunda
W. psychrotolerans
W. pulchriflava
W. rapida
W. schleiferi
W. sediminis
W. tangerina
W. thalassocola
W. ulvae
W. undariae
W. ursingii	
W. vidalii
W. wandonensis
W. wichelsiae

References

Further reading
 
 

Flavobacteria
Bacteria genera
Taxa described in 2005